Phrynetopsis loveni is a species of beetle in the family Cerambycidae. It was described by Per Olof Christopher Aurivillius in 1925. It was described by Tanzania, Kenya, and Uganda.

References

Phrynetini
Beetles described in 1925